Tarabai Bhosale (Pronunciation: [t̪aːɾabaːi]; née Mohite) was the regent of the Maratha Empire of India from 1700 until 1708. She was the queen of Rajaram Bhonsale, and daughter-in-law of the empire's founder Chatrapati Shivaji Maharaj. She is acclaimed for her role in keeping alive the resistance against Mughal occupation of Maratha territories after the death of her husband, and acting  as the regent during the minority of her son, Shivaji II.

Family and early life

Tarabai came from Mohite clan. She was the daughter of Commander-in-Chief Hambirrao Mohite of Shivaji Maharaj, the founder-king of the Maratha empire. Hambirrao's sister Soyarabai was the queen of Shivaji Maharaj and the mother of his younger son Rajaram I. Tarabai married Rajaram Maharaj at the age of 8 in 1682, becoming his second wife.

After the death of his step-brother and predecessor Sambhaji Maharaj, Rajaram ruled the Maratha Empire from 1689 to 1700, when his first wife Jankibai was the empress consort. On Rajaram's death in March 1700, Tarabai proclaimed her infant son, Shivaji II (later known as Shivaji I of Kolhapur) as Rajaram's successor and herself as the regent.

Tarabai In Command

As the regent, Tarabai took charge of the war against the Mughal emperor Aurangzeb's forces. Tarabai was skilled in cavalry movement and made strategic movements herself during wars. She personally led the war and continued the fight against the Mughals. A truce was offered to the Mughals in such a way that the Mughal emperor promptly rejected it and Tarabai continued the Maratha resistance. By 1705, Marathas had crossed the Narmada River and made small incursions in Malwa, retreating immediately. In 1706, Tarabai was captured by Mughal forces for a brief period of 4 days but she escaped after the Mughal camp - in which she was being held - was ambushed by the Marathas. The Maratha country was relieved at the news of the death of Aurangzeb who died at Ahmadnagar and buried at Khuldabad near Aurangabad, Maharashtra in 1707.

Of the years 1700–1707, Jadunath Sarkar, a prominent Indian historian especially of the Mughal dynasty, has opined: "During this period, the supreme guiding force in Maharashtra was not any minister but the dowager queen Tarabai.  Her administrative genius and strength of character saved the nation in that awful crisis."

Battle with Shahu

In order to divide the Maratha onslaught, the Mughals released Shahu I, Sambhaji's son and Tarabai's nephew, on certain conditions. He immediately challenged Tarabai and her son Shivaji II for leadership of the Maratha polity. Shahu eventually prevailed, sidelining Tarabai, due to his legal position and Peshwa Balaji Vishwanath's diplomacy. Tarabai established a rival court in Kolhapur in 1709, and established her son Shivaji II as the first Chhatrapati of Kolhapur known as Shivaji I of Kolhapur. However, Shivaji I of Kolhapur was deposed in 1714 by Rajaram's other widow, Rajasabai, who put her own son, Sambhaji II, on the throne. Sambhaji II imprisoned Tarabai and her son. Shivaji I of Kolhapur died in 1726. Tarabai later reconciled with Shahu I in 1730 and went to live in Satara but without any political power.

Conflict with Balaji Baji Rao

In 1740s, during the last years of Shahu's life, Tarabai presented to the heirless Shahu I a young man, who she claimed was her grandson, and thus, a direct descendant of Shivaji. She claimed that Rajaram had been concealed after his birth for his protection and had been raised by the wife of a soldier. Shahu, who did not have a son of his own, adopted the young man who later succeeded him as Rajaram II (also known as Ramaraja). 

After Shahu's death in 1749, Rajaram II succeeded him as the Chhatrapati. When Balaji Baji Rao left for the Mughal frontier, Tarabai urged Rajaram II to remove him from the post of Peshwa. When Rajaram refused, she imprisoned him in a dungeon at Satara, on 24 November 1750. She also claimed that he was an impostor and she had falsely presented him as her grandson to Shahu.
 
In early October 1750, Tarabai had met Umabai Dabhade, who also held a grudge against the Peshwa. Umabai dispatched 15,000 troops led by Damaji Rao Gaekwad in support of Tarabai. Gaekwad defeated a 20,000-strong force led by the Peshwa loyalist Trimbakrao Purandare at Nimb, a small town north of Satara. He then marched to Satara, where he was received by Tarabai. However, Trimbakrao re-formed his army and on 15 March, attacked Gaekwad's army, which was encamped on the banks of Venna River. Gaekwad was defeated in this battle and forced to retreat with heavy losses.

Meanwhile, Balaji Baji Rao returned from the Mughal frontier, reaching Satara on 24 April. He stormed the Yavateshwar garrison in Satara, defeating Tarabai's forces. He surrounded the Satara fort and asked Tarabai to release Rajaram II, whose physical and mental condition had deteriorated considerably. Tarabai refused and Balaji Baji Rao left for Pune since a siege of the well-provisioned and strong Satara fort would not be easy. Meanwhile, Damaji Gaekwad, Umabai Dabhade and their relatives were arrested by the Peshwa's men.

A section of Tarabai's troops in the Satara garrison unsuccessfully rebelled against her. She beheaded the rebel leader Anandrao Jadhav. However, she realized that she would not be able to fight Balaji Baji Rao, and agreed to meet him in Pune for a peace agreement. Janoji Bhonsle, also a rival of Balaji Baji Rao, was in the neighbourhood of Pune with a strong army and agreed to protect her against any harm. In Pune, Balaji Baji Rao treated her respectfully and after some reluctance, Tarabai accepted Balaji Baji Rao's superiority. She agreed to dismiss her lieutenant Baburao Jadhav, whom Balaji Baji Rao disliked. In return, the Balaji Baji Rao forgave her. On 14 September 1752, the two took oaths at Khandoba temple in Jejuri, promising mutual peace. At this oath ceremony, Tarabai also swore that Rajaram II was not her grandson. Nevertheless, Balaji Baji Rao retained Rajaram II as the titular Chhatrapati and a powerless figurehead.

In popular culture
 Raja Bhawanrao Pant Pratinidhi of Aundh State in 1927  commissioned noted Marathi artist   M. V. Dhurandhar to paint a picture of Tarabai leading her troops.
 Nishigandha Wad portrayed Tarabai in the 1993 historical drama film Shivrayachi Soon Tararani, directed by Dinkar D. Patil.
 Pallavi Joshi plays the role of Tarabai in the 2017 TV series Peshwa Bajirao.
Neena Kulkarni played the role of Tararani in 2019 TV serial Swamini.
 Swarda Thigale played the role of Tararani in 2021 Marathi series Swarajya Saudamini Tararani.

References

Regents of India
Indian women in war
Women in 17th-century warfare
Women in 18th-century warfare
18th-century Indian monarchs
1675 births
1761 deaths
18th-century women rulers
Warriors of the Maratha Empire
Indian female royalty
18th-century Indian women
18th-century Indian people
Cavalry commanders
Female army generals
Queen mothers
Women of the Maratha Empire
Indian military leaders